Birth of a Cynic is the first independent release of post-grunge rock band 8stops7.  It was produced by Paul Lani & Paul Yered and released on Elephant Ear Records.

Musicians 
 Evan Sula-Goff  (vocals, guitar)  
 Seth Watson (guitar, background vocals)
 Adam Powell (drums, background vocals)
 Alex Viveros (bass, background vocals)

Album artwork 
Album artwork was photographed by Scott Council, who went on to a successful career in entertainment photography. The images were photographed in Ventura, CA and Ojai, CA. Marty Johnston was the graphic designer.

The booklet from original release was printed as a blue and black duotone on white paper with hidden elements in a high gloss varnish, while the reissue was printed in full color and had slightly different artwork.

Four of its tracks were re-recorded for the band's major label release In Moderation on Warner Bros. Records/Reprise Records. In 2007, three songs were featured in the short film He's Not My...,  which was produced by Contempovision Films.

Track listing
 "Doubt" (3:50)
 "Fate" (4:34)
 "Esteem" (4:38)*
 "Not Alive" (3:56)*
 "Long Distance" (2:38)
 "Wider" (3:24)*
 "Wait I Swear" (3:48)
 "What's The Big Idea" (4:15)
 "Weekend" (4:46)
 "Disappear" (3:51)
 "Forget" (3:31)*

* Asterisk indicates song was re-recorded and included on the band's following album: In Moderation.

References

1998 albums
8stops7 albums